Matsumoto City Gymnasium is an indoor sporting arena located in Matsumoto, Japan. The capacity of the arena is 6,000 spectators. It was one of the host cities of the official 2010 Women's Volleyball World Championship. It also hosted some of the volleyball events at the 2007 FIVB Men's World Cup.

External links
Venue information

Indoor arenas in Japan
Shinshu Brave Warriors
Sports venues in Nagano Prefecture